The Don Gaspar Bridge, in Santa Fe, New Mexico, brings Don Gaspar Avenue over the Santa Fe River, between Alameda and E. De Vargas Streets.  It was built in 1934.  It was listed on the National Register of Historic Places in 2002.

The bridge's design introduced, to the area, use of reinforced concrete to make a thinner, more appealing appearance.  Its layout was designed by state bridge engineer E.B. Van de Greyn.

It has also been known as El Puente de Los Conquistadores.

References

External links

National Register of Historic Places in Santa Fe County, New Mexico
Buildings and structures completed in 1934
1934 establishments in New Mexico
Pueblo Revival architecture in Santa Fe, New Mexico